Olliffiella cristicola, the gall kermes, is a species of gall-like scale insect in the family Kermesidae.

References

Articles created by Qbugbot
Insects described in 1896
Kermesidae